Woodland is an unincorporated community located, in the towns of Herman and Rubicon, in Dodge County, Wisconsin, United States.  It is located at the intersection of Wisconsin Highway 67 and County highway WS.

Notable people
Addie Joss, baseball player, was born in Woodland.

Images

References

Unincorporated communities in Wisconsin
Unincorporated communities in Dodge County, Wisconsin